Chia-Kun (John) Chu was a Chinese-American applied mathematician who was the Fu Foundation Professor Emeritus of Applied Mathematics at Columbia University. He had been on Columbia faculty since 1965 and served as the department chairman of applied physics and nuclear engineering three times (1982–1983, 1985–1988, 1995–1997).

Chu received a bachelor's in Mechanical Engineering from Chiao-Tung University in 1948, a master's from Cornell University in 1950, and a Ph.D. from Courant Institute, New York University in 1959.

He was an internationally recognized applied mathematician and one of the pioneers of computational mathematics in fluid dynamics, magnetohydrodynamics, and shock waves. He developed approximations to the differential equations of fluid dynamics and coined the term "computational fluid dynamics".

Chu received numerous honors. He was a recipient of Guggenheim Fellowship and was elected fellow of American Physical Society and fellow of Japan Society for the Promotion of Science. He was awarded an honorary Doctor of Science degree from Columbia University in 2006.

Chia-Kun Chu was the son of bank chairman Ju Tang Chu. Chia-Kun Chu was also the brother-in-law of Z.Y. Fu, a Columbia donor who gave his name for the Fu Foundation School of Engineering and Applied Science.

References

Notes

21st-century American physicists
20th-century American mathematicians
National Chiao Tung University (Shanghai) alumni
Cornell University College of Engineering alumni
Courant Institute of Mathematical Sciences alumni
Fluid dynamicists
Year of birth missing (living people)
Living people
American academics of Chinese descent
Fellows of the American Physical Society
Columbia University faculty
Scientists from Shanghai